is a Japanese manga series written and illustrated by Shinobu Kaitani. It was first serialized in Shueisha's Jump X manga magazine from 2011 to 2014, when the magazine ceased publication, and later ran in Tonari no Young Jump online magazine from 2014 to 2016.

Publication
Winners Circle e Yōkoso, written and illustrated by Shinobu Kaitani, was first serialized in Shueisha's Jump X manga magazine from July 25, 2011, to October 10, 2014, when the magazine ceased its publication. It was then moved to the Tonari no Young Jump online magazine, where it ran until its conclusion on October 28, 2016. Shueisha collected its chapters in nine tankōbon volumes, released from April 10, 2012, to November 18, 2016.

Volume list

References

External links
 
 

Horse racing in anime and manga
Seinen manga
Shueisha manga